Andrew Alford (5 August 1904 – 25 January 1992) was an American electrical engineer and inventor.

Born in Samara, Russia, Alford invented and developed antennas for radio navigation systems, now used for VHF omnidirectional range and instrument landing systems.

Alford graduated from the University of California in 1924. He received an honorary doctorate from Ohio University in 1975.

California Institute of Technology, 1927–28;
Fox Film Corporation, 1929–31;
Mackay Radio and Telegraph Company, 1934–41;
Air Navigation Lab, International Telegraph Development Corporation, 1938–41;
Harvard University Radio Research Lab from 1943 to 1945;
Direction Finder and Antenna Division, ITT, from 1943 to 1945;
Founded the Alford Manufacturing Company.

He invented a balanced square antenna named the Alford Loop.

In 1965, the first Master FM Antenna system in the world designed to allow individual FM stations to broadcast simultaneously from one source was erected on the Empire State Building. The original system was co-invented by Alford and Frank Kear.

In 1983 Alford was inducted into the National Inventors Hall of Fame for his invention of the Localizer Antenna System which guides aircraft during landings.

See also
 AN/MRN-1

US Patents
 Localizer Antenna System

1904 births
1992 deaths
Emigrants from the Russian Empire to the United States
Inventors from the Russian Empire
American electrical engineers
UC Berkeley College of Engineering alumni
Harvard University staff
20th-century American engineers
20th-century American inventors